In enzymology, a (R)-limonene 6-monooxygenase is an enzyme that catalyzes the chemical reaction

(+)-(R)-limonene + NADPH + H + O  (+)-trans-carveol + NADP + HO

The 4 substrates of this enzyme are (+)-(R)-limonene, NADPH, H, and O, whereas its 3 products are (+)-trans-carveol, NADP, and HO.

This enzyme belongs to the family of oxidoreductases, specifically those acting on paired donors, with O2 as oxidant and incorporation or reduction of oxygen. The oxygen incorporated need not be derived from O2 with NADH or NADPH as one donor, and incorporation of one atom o oxygen into the other donor.  The systematic name of this enzyme class is (R)-limonene,NADPH:oxygen oxidoreductase (6-hydroxylating). Other names in common use include (+)-limonene-6-hydroxylase, and (+)-limonene 6-monooxygenase.  This enzyme participates in monoterpenoid biosynthesis and limonene and pinene degradation.

See also
 CYP2C19

References

 
 

EC 1.14.13
NADPH-dependent enzymes
Enzymes of unknown structure